The 1946 All-Ireland Senior Football Championship was the 60th staging of Ireland's premier Gaelic football knock-out competition.

The Munster Quarter-Final Kerry ended Cork's All Ireland title.

Results

Connacht Senior Football Championship

Note: Roscommon’s goal proved to be a controversial one.  The goal was scored by Roscommon’s Jimmy Murray and there was some confusion as to whether or not it would be allowed as the umpires failed to signal the score.  It was only after Jimmy Murray had raised the green flag himself that the umpires finally signalled the goal. The referee, speaking after the match to the Irish Press match reporter ‘Green Flag’ (an appropriate sobriquet) stated that he had allowed the score because in his opinion the Mayo goalkeeper, Tom Byrne, was behind the line when he saved Murray’s initial goal effort.  In the week following the final, Mayo entered a formal objection with the Connacht Council, reportedly about the legality of two of the Roscommon team.  Roscommon entered a counter-objection.  At a meeting of the Connacht Council on 5/8/1946 at Castlerea, both the objection and counter-objection were withdrawn, the referee’s report was adopted and a replay ordered.  (Source: Irish Press reports July, August 1946).

Leinster Senior Football Championship

Munster Senior Football Championship

Ulster Senior Football Championship

All-Ireland Senior Football Championship

Championship statistics

Miscellaneous

 Antrim won the Ulster title for the first time since 1913.
 The All-Ireland final was originally scheduled for 22 September 1946, but was delayed for two weeks as part of the "Save the Harvest" campaign.
 The All-Ireland final ends in a draw and goes to a replay for the first time since 1943 as Kerry win their 16th title there are now the county that has now won the most All Ireland finals.
 Kerry goalkeeper Dan O'Keeffe becomes the first Gaelic Football player to win a 7th All-Ireland winners medal on the field of play, a record which stood until 1986.

References